The 2011 Texas Southern Tigers football team represented Texas Southern University in the 2011 NCAA Division I FCS football season. The Tigers were led by first-year interim head coach Kevin Ramsey and played four home games at Delmar Stadium and two at Reliant Stadium. They are a member of the West Division of the Southwestern Athletic Conference. They finished the season 4–7, 2–7 in SWAC play to finish in last place in the West Division.

Schedule

References

Texas Southern
Texas Southern Tigers football seasons
Texas Southern Tigers football